State Route 87 (SR 87) is a  state highway that extends from the Florida state line, in Geneva County to Troy in Pike County. At the state line, the roadway continues as Florida State Road 81 (SR 81). Other cities and towns along the route include Elba, and Samson.

Route description

The southern terminus of SR 87 is at the Florida state line south of Fairview. The highway travels through rural areas of southeast Alabama. The highway's northern terminus is at U.S. Route 231 (US 231) in Troy.

Major intersections

See also

References

087
Transportation in Geneva County, Alabama
Transportation in Coffee County, Alabama
Transportation in Pike County, Alabama